Stéphane Poulhies (born 26 June 1985) is a French former road bicycle racer, who rode professionally between 2006 and 2017 for the , , , and  teams.

Major results

2005
 Ronde de l'Isard
1st Points classification
1st Stage 3
 1st Stage 1 Le Triptyque des Monts et Châteaux
 2nd  Road race, Mediterranean Games
 2nd Road race, National Under-23 Road Championships
2007
 1st Stage 1 Tour de l'Avenir
 7th Boucles de l'Aulne
2010
 1st Stage 2 Tour de l'Ain
 8th Overall Driedaagse van West-Vlaanderen
2011
 1st Stage 4 Étoile de Bessèges
 2nd Circuito de Getxo
 5th Cholet-Pays de Loire
 7th Nokere Koerse
2012
 1st Stage 5a Étoile de Bessèges
 1st Stage 1 Route du Sud
 3rd Grand Prix d'Isbergues
 4th Overall Tour de Picardie
 4th Clásica de Almería
 7th Paris–Troyes
2013
 5th Clásica de Almería
2014
 5th Clásica de Almería
 9th Road race, National Road Championships
 10th Circuito de Getxo
2015
 1st  Overall Tour de Gironde
1st  Points classification
1st Stage 3
 3rd Overall Kreiz Breizh Elites
1st Stage 1
2016
 1st  Mountains classification Four Days of Dunkirk
2018
 3rd Overall Tour de la Pharmacie Centrale

Grand Tour general classification results timeline

References

External links

Profile at AG2R Prévoyance official website

French male cyclists
1985 births
Living people
Sportspeople from Albi
Mediterranean Games silver medalists for France
Mediterranean Games medalists in cycling
Competitors at the 2005 Mediterranean Games
Cyclists from Occitania (administrative region)